Note: For information on the transcription used, see National Library at Calcutta romanization. Exception from the standard are the romanization of Sinhala long "ä" as "ää", and the non-marking of prenasalized stops.

Sinhala words of Portuguese origin came about during the period of Portuguese colonial rule in Sri Lanka between 1505–1658. This period saw rapid absorption of many Portuguese words into the local language brought about by the interaction between Portuguese colonials and the Sinhalese people, mainly in the coastal areas of the island. A wide variety of words were adopted from administrative terms to military terms, which reveals several points of contact between the two groups. In addition to influences on language, the Portuguese introduced the Catholic religion to Sri Lanka, various forms of western clothing and also contributed to the formation of Baila, a Sri Lankan form of music.

Types of loanwords
Borrowings
The words pertaining to the fields of commerce, administration, botany, food and military are the most numerous; this is to be expected because of many new innovations and goods that reached Sri Lanka via the Portuguese.

However it is important to note that the range of borrowings goes beyond the scope to be expected for a situation where two neighbouring peoples exchange material goods: There are many Portuguese loanwords pertaining to everyday and social life (kinship terms, ordinary activities etc.). Additionally, many lexical words (nouns, adjectives and verbs) have also been borrowed.

The borrowing process

Portuguese loanwords in Sinhala rarely appear in the same form as the original word, the vast majority of them having undergone naturalisation. Usually, a word has undergone some kind of modification to fit into the Sinhala phonological (e.g. bandeja becomes bandesiya because the sound of the Portuguese /j/, does not exist in the Sinhala phoneme inventory) or morphological system (e.g. lenço becomes lensuva because Sinhala inanimate nouns (see grammatical gender) need to end with /a/, in order to be declineable).

These are the main ways Portuguese words are incorporated into the Sinhala lexicon with different endings:
With an /ma/ or /na/ or /va/ added to Portuguese words ending in /o/ (e.g. gancho > gāncuva).
With an /aya/ or /uva/ added to Portuguese words ending in consonants (e.g. lençol > lensōluva).
With a /ya/ added to words ending in /a/ or /e/ or /i/ (e.g. diamante > diyamantiya).
With the animate ending /yā/ or /vā/ added to Portuguese words signifying living beings or (e.g. burro > būruvā).

Adjectives that end in vowels are generally preserved in the original form.

There are over 150 words in the following list.

Proper Names

Many Sinhalese adopted Portuguese names, especially surnames. Some are very common (e.g. Perera, De Silva). The names, however, do not necessarily denote Portuguese ancestry or  Christian religious affiliation, with many Buddhist Sinhalese having Portuguese-origin surnames, as Buddhism does not recognise the notion of heresy for not naming their children with names which do not originate from the Pali language

See also
 Dutch loanwords in Sinhala
 English loanwords in Sinhala
 Tamil loanwords in Sinhala

External links
Portuguese words in Sinhala

Sinhala
Sinhala words
Lists of Sinhala words of foreign origin
Portuguese language in Asia